Anna Hedvig "Hedda" Wrangel née Lewenhaupt (11 December 1792 in Forstena – 24 July 1833, in Ovesholm) was a Swedish composer.

Hedda Wrangel was the daughter of colonel count Gustaf Julius Lewenhaupt and Anna Helena Alströmer, and married in 1810 at Karlberg Palace to the courtier Baron Henning Wrangel af Adinal. Her husband was known for his hot temperament, love life and duels. The couple mainly lived at Sperlingsholm manor. She had no children.

Esaias Tegnér portrayed her in a poem (1827) in which he wrote: "When she sings, oh, breathing stops, and the tongue of gossip itself fall silent." 
After her death, Fredrika Bremer commented: "She flew through life as a dithyramb."

Works
 Tegnér, Esaias; Wrangel, Anna Hedvig f. Lewenhaupt (1828). Tre sånger utur Frithiofs saga. Musik, tillegnad Frithiofs skald af Hedda Wrangel. ['Three Songs from the Saga of Frithiof. Music, dedicated to the Poet Frithiof by Hedda Wrangel']  Stockholm. Libris 2435497
. Frithiofs frieri, Andante
. Kung Ring, Moderato
. Frithiofs frestelse, Allegretto
Ave verum pour chant et orgue, piano composition, autograph

References
 Sperlingsholm. Öfraby socken, Halmstads härad. i Projekt Runeberg
 Eliæson, Åke; Olsson, Bror (1949). Esaias Tegnér: en monografi i bild. Malmö: Allhem. Sid. 85. Libris 364522
 http://www.adelsvapen.com/genealogi/Wrangel_af_Adinal_nr_199

1792 births
1833 deaths
19th-century classical composers
19th-century Swedish women musicians
Swedish classical composers
Swedish countesses
Swedish women classical composers
19th-century women composers

Hedda